Halide is a feminine Turkish given name, it may refer to:

People
 Halide Edib Adıvar (1884–1964), Turkish novelist and feminist political leader
 Halide Pişkin (1906–1959), Turkish stage, radio and movie actress
 Halide Nusret Zorlutuna (1901–1984), Turkish poet and novelist

See also
 Halide, a binary compound

Turkish feminine given names